Ammatho is a genus of erebid moths, first described by Francis Walker in 1855.

Species 

 Ammatho admirabilis (Schaus, 1922)
 Ammatho amaculata (Volynkin & Černý, 2016)
 Ammatho amoenissima (Volynkin & Černý, 2019)
 Ammatho asotoida (Volynkin & Černý, 2018)
 Ammatho bornescripta (Holloway, 2001)
 Ammatho bucseki (Volynkin & Černý, 2018)
 Ammatho callida (Fang, 1991)
 Ammatho cao (Volynkin & Černý, 2019)
 Ammatho carbonisata (Černý, 1995)
 Ammatho celebesa (Tams, 1935)
 Ammatho cernyi (Volynkin, 2018)
 Ammatho chi (Roepke, 1946)
 Ammatho collivolans (Butler, 1881)
 Ammatho compar (Fang, 1991)
 Ammatho complicata (Butler, 1877)
 Ammatho conformis (Fang, 1991)
 Ammatho convexa (Wileman, 1910)
 Ammatho cruenia (Hampson, 1918)
 Ammatho cuneonotatus Walker, 1855
 Ammatho delineata (Walker, 1854)
 Ammatho dentata (Wileman, 1910)
 Ammatho dohertyi (Rothschild, 1913)
 Ammatho dubatolovi (Volynkin & Černý, 2019)
 Ammatho duopunctata (Semper, 1899)
 Ammatho eos (Volynkin & Černý, 2019)
 Ammatho erythropoda (Roepke, 1946)
 Ammatho euryphaessa (Volynkin & Černý, 2019)
 Ammatho fasciata (Leech, 1899)
 Ammatho flavoplagiata (Rothschild, 1913)
 Ammatho garo (Volynkin, 2018)
 Ammatho helenae (Černý, 2016)
 Ammatho honbaensis (Dubatolov & Bucsek, 2013)
 Ammatho hypoprepioides (Walker, 1862)
 Ammatho ivanovamariae (Volynkin, Černý & Huang, 2019)
 Ammatho karenkensis (Matsumura, 1930)
 Ammatho kishidai (Volynkin & Černý, 2019)
 Ammatho kuatunensis (Daniel, 1951)
 Ammatho longstriga (Fang, 1991)
 Ammatho maculifasciata (Hampson, 1894)
 Ammatho marginis (Fang, 1991)
 Ammatho melanovena (Černý, 2016)
 Ammatho mene (Volynkin & Černý, 2019)
 Ammatho mesomene (Volynkin, Černý & Huang, 2019)
 Ammatho mesortha (Hampson, 1897)
 Ammatho midzhan (Volynkin, 2018)
 Ammatho multistriata (Hampson, 1894)
 Ammatho navneetsinghi (Volynkin & Černý, 2018)
 Ammatho nemea (Volynkin & Černý, 2019)
 Ammatho nigralba (Hampson, 1894)
 Ammatho novaepommeraniae (Strand, 1922)
 Ammatho ovale (Hampson, 1894)
 Ammatho pandeia (Volynkin & Černý, 2019)
 Ammatho parameia (Rothschild, 1913)
 Ammatho paraprominens (Huang & Wang, 2018)
 Ammatho persephone (Volynkin & Černý, 2018)
 Ammatho pluma (Černý, 2009)
 Ammatho prominens (Moore, 1878)
 Ammatho pseudocardinalis (Volynkin & Černý, 2017)
 Ammatho pseudoradians (Joshi, N. Singh & Volynkin, 2018)
 Ammatho radians (Moore, 1878)
 Ammatho rhipiptera (Wileman & West, 1928)
 Ammatho roseororatus Butler, 1877
 Ammatho salakia (Schaus, 1922)
 Ammatho salamandra (Černý, 2009)
 Ammatho sanguitincta (Hampson, 1900)
 Ammatho scripta (Walker, 1864)
 Ammatho selene (Volynkin & Černý, 2019)
 Ammatho specialis (Fang, 1991)
 Ammatho speideli (Volynkin, Černý & Huang, 2019)
 Ammatho sublucana (Volynkin & Černý, 2017)
 Ammatho subzebrina (Volynkin & Černý, 2018)
 Ammatho syntypica (Swinhoe, 1906)
 Ammatho syntypicoida (Volynkin & Černý, 2019)
 Ammatho takamukui (Matsumura, 1927) 
 Ammatho terminifusca (Daniel, 1955)
 Ammatho umbrosa (Hampson, 1896)
 Ammatho visaya (Volynkin & Černý, 2019)
 Ammatho wernerthomasi (Volynkin, 2018)
 Ammatho zebrina (Moore, 1878)

References 

Moth genera
Nudariina
Moths described in 1855